Kenward is a surname. Notable people with the surname include:

Betty Kenward (1906–2001), English journalist
Charles Kenward (1877–1948), English cricketer
James Kenward (1908–1994), English writer and illustrator
Michael Kenward (born 1945), British science writer
Paul Kenward (born 1973), British businessman
Richard Kenward (1875–1957), English cricketer
Shane Kenward (born 1972), rugby league player